Richard Jones (born c. 1957) is a Canadian voice actor, voice director, writer and content developer. Since 1982, he has worked with Fox, Disney, Universal, Hanna-Barbera, Alphanim, Cinar and Nelvana. Jones has been nominated for a Gemini Award twice in 1988 and 2003.

Bio
During his early years, Rick obtained an undergraduate degree in biology. Whilst he was working on a geology thesis, a friend from Carleton University working at the school radio station asked him to do a voice for an ad, which helped start Rick's career. His first work was in the special The Care Bears in the Land Without Feelings.

Filmography

Voice work - series and games
 The Care Bears in the Land Without Feelings (1983) - Tender Heart Bear/Good Luck Bear/Birthday Bear
 The Care Bears Battle the Freeze Machine (1984) - Tender Heart Bear/Good Luck Bear/Birthday Bear
 The Velveteen Rabbit (1985) - Rabbit 1/Rabbit 2
 The Raccoons (1985–1992) - Sidekick/Delivery Ape/Master of Ceremonies/Mr. Mammoth's Assistant
 The Tin Soldier (1986) - Lefty/Rat 1/Rat 3
 Babar and Father Christmas (1986) - Zephir/Lazzaro/Podular/Mice
 Dennis the Menace (1986–1988) - Additional Voices (Season 2)
 The Adventures of Teddy Ruxpin (1986–1987) - Additional Voices
 Diplodos (1988) - Puncher
 The Railway Dragon (1988) - French Chef/Hunter's Son
 Bluetoes the Christmas Elf (1988) - Lonesome/Whitey
 The Smoggies (1988–1991) - Uncle Boom/Sailor/Choo-Choo
 The Admiral and the Princess (1989) - Baggot
 Bobobobs (1989) - Cornelius/Blip
 Happy Castle (1989)
 Nutsberry Town (1989–1990) - Mr. Lettuce/Mr. Pumpkin
 Bumpety Boo (1989) - Additional Voices
 The Littl' Bits (1990–1992) - Elderbit
 The Little Flying Bears (1990) - Ozzy/Slink
 The Jungle Book (1990) - Anwar/Dusty/Sargah
 Sharky & George (1990–1991) - Additional Voices
 Saban's Adventures of Pinocchio (1990–1991) - The Cricket
 Saban's Adventures of Peter Pan (1990–1991) - Additional Voices
 Maya the Honey Bee (1990–1992) - Orvill/Alexander/Flap
 Rupert (1991–1997) - Yum
 Saban's Adventures of the Little Mermaid (1991) - Additional Voices
 Samurai Pizza Cats (1991) - Speedy Cerviche/Mojo Rojo
 C.L.Y.D.E. (1991) - C.L.Y.D.E.
 Bob in a Bottle (1991) - Additional Voices
 Jungle Tales (1991) - Pete Penguin/Scooter Squirrel
 Young Robin Hood (1991–1992)
 Tooth Fairy, Where Are You? (1991) - Judge/Father
 The Legend of the North Wind (1992) - Barnaby
 The Legend of White Fang (1992–1994) - Matt
 Saban's Gulliver's Travels (1992–1993) - Additional Voices
 Christopher Columbus (1992–1993) - Bartolomeo Columbus
 Around the World in Eighty Dreams (1992–1994) - Oscar/Grandpa Tadpole
 Spirou (1992–1993) - Kanvalo-Bobo
 Sandokan (1992–1994)
 Bunch of Munsch (1992)
 Favorite Songs (1992)
 The Real Story of Twinkle Twinkle Little Star (1992) - Paddy/Guard
 The Real Story of Au Clair de La Lune (1992) - Sandman
 The Adventures of Grady Greenspace (1992–1995) - Scuzzy
 Kitty Cats (1992–1997) - Flap
 David Copperfield (1993) - Additional Voices
 The Busy World of Richard Scarry (1993–1997) - Additional Voices
 The Adventures of Huckleberry Finn (1993–1994) - Additional Voices
 Go Hugo Go (1993) - Zag
 Zoe and Charlie (1993–1994)
 Papa Beaver's Storytime (1993–1994) - Additional Voices
 For Better or For Worse (TV Specials) (1994, 1995) - Car Dealer/Pizza Man/Police Officer
 Anna Banana (1994–1997) - Mr Bliffle
 Cat Tales (1994–1995) - The Duck
 Jagged Alliance (1994)
 Taa Tam (1995)
 The Little Lulu Show (1995–1999)
 Little Bear (1995–2000) - No Feet
 The Babaloos (1995–1999) - Teaspoon
 Robinson Sucroe (1995–1996)
 Wimzie's House (1995-1996) - Narrator (Audiobooks)
 The Big Garage (1995–1996) - Yorky/Rusty/Tooly
 Ace Ventura: Pet Detective (1996–1999)
 Sea Dogs (1996–1997)
 The Magical Adventures of Quasimodo (1996–1997)
 Jagged Alliance: Deadly Games (1996)
 Tracer (1996)
 Dracula's Secret (1996)
 Legends of the Land (1996)
 Stickin' Around (1996–1998) - Additional Voices
 Blazing Dragons (1996–1998) - Evil Knight 1 (Season 2)
 Hugo The Movie Star (1996) - Zag
 Happy Birthday Bunnykins (1996) - Additional Voices
 Arthur (1996–present) - Pepe/Jacob Katzenellenbogan
 Jungle Show (1997) - Tess the Turtle, Bumba the Gorilla and Olive the Monkey
 Donkey Kong Country (1997–2000) - Polly Roger
 Pippi Longstocking (1997–1998) - Kling
 Ned's Newt (1997–1999) - Additional Voices
 Sam and Max: Freelance Police (1997–1998) - Hippie
 Animal Crackers (1997–1999) - Baby Bird/Boa/Additional Voices
 Patrol 03 (1997–1998) - Wilfred
 The Triplets (1997–1999)
 Freaky Stories (1997–2000)
 Ivanhoe (1997–1998)
 The Wombles (1997–1998) - Orinoco
 The Country Mouse and the City Mouse Adventures (1997–1999) - No Tail No Good Nick
 Princess Sissi (1997) - Zottornick
 Birdz (1998–2000) - Gregory Woodpecker
 Anatole (1998–1999)
 Mythic Warriors: Guardians of the Legend (1998–2000)
 The Force of Water (1998)
 Flight Squad (1998–1999)
 Bad Dog (1998–1999) - Dad
 Dog's World (1998–1999)
 Team S.O.S. (1998–2000)
 Kit and Kaboodle (1998–1999)
 Ripley's Believe It or Not!: The Animated Series (1998) - Cyril Barker
 Jim Button (1998–2000) - King
 The Wind (1998) - Narration
 Wheel Meets Friction (1998) - Narration
 The Animal Train (1999) - Jim Jam
 Billy and Buddy (1999)
 X-Chromosome (1999)
 Tommy and Oscar (1999–2000) - Oscar
 The Kids from Room 402 (1999–2001) - Mr Karl
 Mona the Vampire (1999–2006)
 Rotten Ralph (1999–2001) - Ralph
 Mega Babies (1999–2001) - Additional Voices
 Hoze Houndz (1999) - Hozer/Squirt/Additional Voices
 Toad Patrol (1999–2001) - Erebus/Puff Ball/Digger
 A Miss Mallard Mystery (1999–2000)
 Kevin Spencer (1999–2005)
 Jagged Alliance 2 (1999)
 Jagged Alliance 2: Unfinished Business (2000)
 The Toy Castle (2000–2003) - Narrator
 Lion of Oz (2000)
 Sinbad (2000)
 Pirate Family (2000–2001)
 Kid Paddle (2000–2006)
 Charley and Mimmo (2000–2002) - Ted
 The Twins (2000–2002)
 Wunschpunsch (2000) - Mauricio di Mauro/Bubonic Preposteror
 Caillou (2000-2003) - Rexy
 Marsupilami (2000–2003)
 For Better or For Worse (2000–2002) (TV series) - Additional Voices
 Inuk (2001) - Tik
 Snailympics (2001–2002)
 Wombat City (2001–2005) - Additional Voices
 Belphegor (2001–2004) - Additional Voices
 X-DuckX (2001–2002) - Slax
 Iron Nose (2001–2003)
 Spaced Out (2001–2004) - Fax/Goodgrief/Guy
 Lucky Luke (2001–2003) - Jack Dalton
 The Bellflower Bunnies (2001–2005)
 Explosives (2001)
 Edward (2001–2003)
 Fridge Magnets (2001) - Max
 Momo (2001) - Hahn/Bruno
 Wizardry 8 (2001)
 Simon in the Land of Chalk Drawings (2001–2002) - Henry
 Sagwa, the Chinese Siamese Cat (2001–2003) - Fu-Fu
 Shaolin Kids (2001–2003)
 Fred the Caveman (2002) - Fred
 Evolution Worlds (2002) - Pedro
 ChalkZone (2002–2006) - Bruno Bullnerd
 Pet Pals (2002–2003) - Mouse/Duck/Mole
 Malo Korrigan (2002–2005) - Jonas
 Kaput and Zösky (2002–2003) - Kaput
 Splinter Cell (2002)
 Daft Planet (2002)
 Pig City (2002–2004) - Additional Voices
 Martin Morning (2003–2004)
 Creepschool (2003–2004)
 Jacob Two-Two (2003-2007)
 King (2003-2005) – Additional Voices
 Ratz (2003) - Razmo
 Flat! (2003)
 Pecola (2003)
 Noël-Noël (2003)
 Mica (2003)
 Kitou (2003–2004) - Grandpa
 Cosmic Cowboys (2003) - Curtis/Cereal Bob
 Silent Storm (2003)
 The Secret World of Benjamin Bear (2003–2006) - Raymond/Howie
 What's with Andy? (2003–2007) - Mayor Henry K. Roth
 Potatoes and Dragons (2003–2005) - Various Knights
 Ocean Tales (2003–2006) - Commandant Costeau
 Martin Mystery (2003–2006)
 The Three Pigs (2003–2004) - Pig 1
 Woofy (2003–2004) - Remi
 Tupu (2004) - Norton
 Prudence Gumshoe (2004)
 Peep and the Big Wide World (2004-2011) - The Fish/Additional Voices
 The Boy (2004–2005) - Various Villains
 This Just In! (2004) - Guard 1
 Gino the Chicken (2004–2006) - Ray Mundo
 Lili's Island (2004–2007)
 Atomic Betty (2004-2006)
 3 Gold Coins (2004–2005)
 The Adventures of Princess Sydney (2004)
 Tradition of the Christmas Log (2004) - Mr. Bakewell
 Winx Club (2004–present)
 Dragon Hunters (2004) - Gwizdo/Hector
 The Eggs (2004-2005) - Eggor
 Tripping the Rift (2004–2007) - Whip
 Faireez (2005) - Jumphrey/Ogle
 Splinter Cell: Chaos Theory (2005)
 Funpak (2005)
 Spookley the Square Pumpkin (2005) - Edgar
 Monster Allergy (2005) - Bombo/Bram-Bombak
 Yakari (2005) - Slow Caribou
 Wayside (2005-2008) 
 My Goldfish is Evil (2006) - Scoop
 Arthur and the Invisibles (2006) - Additional Voices
 Zoé Kezako (2006) - Additional Voices
 Bronco Teddy (2007)
 Sleeping Betty (2007)
 Moot Moot (2007)
 Naruto (2007)
 The Future is Wild (2007-2008) - Nixes Friends/Additional Voices
 Gofrette (2007–2008) - Wendell
 Leon in Wintertime (2007) - The King
 Manon (2008)
 In Laws (2008)
 Punch! (2008)
 Fred's Head (2008–present) - Gregory Gilbert Pyrowski/Mr. Pyrowski
 Monster Buster Club (2008–2009) - Hugo Smith
 Oscar and Spike (2008–present)
 Huntik: Secrets & Seekers (2009–present) - Klaus/LeBlanche
 Pipi, Pupu and Rosemary (2009)
 Fishtronaut (2009)
 Eo (2009)
 Jimmy Two Shoes (2009-2013)
 Puss 'n Boots (2009) - The Jester
 Walter and Tandoori (2009–present) - Walter
 The Mysteries of Alfred Hedgehog (2009)
 My Life Me (2009)
 PopPixie (2010)
 Spliced (2010)
 Life on the Block (2010)
 Tempo Express (2010)
 Sidekick (2010-2013) - Various
 Assassin's Creed III: The Tyranny of King Washington (2013) - Blue Coats
 The Day My Butt Went Psycho! (2013) - Additional Voices
 Grojband (2013-2016) - Additional voices
 George of the Jungle (2015) - Additional Voices
 Looped (2016) - Additional voices

Voice work - animated features
 The Treasure of Swamp Castle (1988) - General Tubthumper
 Train Mice (1989)
 Dragon and Slippers (1991)
 Charlie Strapp and Froggy Ball Flying High (1991)
 Charles Dickens' David Copperfield (1993)
 Go Hugo Go (1993)
 How the Toys Saved Christmas (1996) - Duck, General Lajoie, Yellow Crayon, Uncle Hank
 Pippi Longstocking (1997) - Constable Kling
 Anastasia (1997) - Nicholas II of Russia, Revolutionary Soldier, Servant, Ticket Agent
 Little Witch (1999) - Parrot, Harry
 Donkey Kong Country: The Legend of the Crystal Coconut (1999) - Polly Roger
 Heavy Metal 2000 (2000) - Zeek
 Stardust (2007 film) (2007) - Kobold
 Gene Fusion (2007)
 Go West: A Lucky Luke Adventure (2008)
 Tripping the Rift: The Movie (2008) - Whip
 Walter's Christmas (2009) - Walter
 Pinocchio (2010)
 Troll: The Tale of a Tail (2018) - Halfstone, Jin, Mort

Acting work - live action movies
 Murder C.O.D. (1990) - Sgt. Decker
 Kindergarten Cop (1990) - Keisha's Father
 The Marla Hanson Story (1991) - Cop #1
 Deadly Game (1991) - Hacker
 Body Language (1992) - Security Guard
 Hear No Evil (1993) - FBI Agent #2
 On Deadly Ground (1994) -  Villager 
 Foxfire (1996) - Security Guard

Writer
 You Can't Do That on Television (1982–1984)
 The Raccoons (1985–1987)
 The Adventures of Teddy Ruxpin (1986-1987)
 Bluetoes the Christmas Elf (1988)
 Happy Castle (1988–1989)
 The Smoggies (1988–1991)
 The Little Engine That Could (1991)
 The Legend of White Fang (1992–1994)
 The Busy World of Richard Scarry (1993–1997)
 Albert the Fifth Musketeer (1993–1994)
 The Little Lulu Show (1995–1999)
 The Babaloos (1995–1999)
 Robinson Sucroe (1995–1996)
 Dog Tracer (1996)
 Caillou (1997–2003)
 Anatole (1998-1999)
 Franklin (1997-1999)
 Kit and Kaboodle (1998)
 Animal Crackers (1997–1999)
 The Adventures of Paddington Bear (1997–2001)
 The Country Mouse and City Mouse Adventures (1998–1999)
 Toad Patrol (1999–2001)
 For Better or For Worse (2000–2002)
 The Toy Castle (2000–2003)

Voice director
 Happy Birthday Bunnykins (1996)
 Bad Dog 2 (1999)
 Toad Patrol (1999–2001)
 For Better or For Worse (2000–2002)
 Wombat City (2005)
 The Eggs (2004–2005)
 What's with Andy? (2001–2007)
 Prudence Gumshoe (2004)
 Spookley the Square Pumpkin (2006)
 Dragon Hunters (2004)
 Faireez (2005)
 Gofrette (2007–2008)
 Okura (2008)
 Lucky Luke Goes West (2008)
 Fishtronaut (2008)
 Fred's Head (2008)
 My Life Me (2009)
 Mati and Dada (2009)
 Walter and Tandoori (2009–present)
 Life on the Block (2010)
 Tempo Express (2010)

References

External links
 

1957 births
Living people
Comedians from Ontario
Canadian male television writers
Canadian male voice actors
Canadian male screenwriters
Canadian television writers
Male actors from Ottawa
Canadian voice directors
Writers from Ottawa
21st-century Canadian screenwriters
Year of birth missing (living people)